Terence Joseph James O'Reilly (born June 7, 1951) is a Canadian former professional ice hockey right winger. He played for the NHL's Boston Bruins and featured in three Stanley Cup Finals. He was one of the most effective enforcers in NHL history. O'Reilly was born in Niagara Falls, Ontario.

Playing career
O'Reilly was picked by the Boston Bruins in the first round as the 14th pick overall in the 1971 NHL Amateur Draft. O'Reilly spent his entire career in Boston, serving as the captain of the Bruins during the 1983–84 and 1984–85 seasons before his retirement. The Bruins retired his No. 24 on October 24, 2002.

O'Reilly made his NHL debut in the Bruins' final game of the 1971–72 regular season.  He scored a goal in Boston's 6-4 victory over Toronto at Boston Garden.

O'Reilly was known for being a tough player, racking up over 200 penalty minutes in five consecutive seasons, and earning for himself the nickname "Bloody O'Reilly" in the press. His teammate, Phil Esposito, dubbed O'Reilly "Taz" in reference to the Tasmanian Devil cartoon character for O'Reilly's reckless, hard driving style of play. He was very protective of his teammates. When the Bruins retired O'Reilly's No. 24, Ray Bourque noted that O'Reilly's banner "hangs next to mine, protecting me again."

On top of his physical presence, he also had a decent scoring touch, highlighted by his 29-goal, 90-point season in 1977–78. He added to that with a 77-point effort the following campaign. He had 211 and 205 minutes in penalties in those seasons respectively, displaying an excellent balance of grit and scoring. He finished his 13-year career with 204 goals, 402 assists for 606 points, a +212 plus/minus and 2,095 minutes in penalties.  As of January 1, 2022, O'Reilly was ranked 20th in career goals scored by a Boston Bruin in regular-season play.

In the infamous December 23, 1979, incident at Madison Square Garden, during a post-game scrum, a New York Rangers fan rolled up a program tightly and smacked Stan Jonathan in the face drawing blood, then stole his stick and wielded it like a weapon. O'Reilly scaled the glass and charged into the stands. His teammates followed when other fans tried to intervene. O'Reilly was suspended eight games for his part in the brawl.

He became the replacement head coach of the Bruins during the 1986–87 NHL season and kept his job until 1989, when he left to care for, and spend more time with, his son who was seriously ill with liver disease.  In that time, he took the Bruins to the Stanley Cup finals in 1988, where they were defeated by the Wayne Gretzky-led Edmonton Oilers. O'Reilly also was an assistant coach for the Rangers for the two seasons prior to the lockout.

Other 

In the Adam Sandler movie Happy Gilmore, O'Reilly is mentioned as Happy Gilmore's favorite hockey player when growing up due to his tough style of play.

O'Reilly has stated his favorite player who played for the Bruins is Milan Lucic, also born on June 7.

He was inducted into the Oshawa Sports Hall of Fame in 1990.

Awards, honours and records 

 NHL All-Star Game — 1975, 1978
 Won the Seventh Player Award — 1975
 Won the Elizabeth C. Dufresne Trophy — 1978
 Bruins Three Stars Awards — 1978, 1979, 1980 
 His #24 Jersey is retired by the Boston Bruins.

Records 
Most Penalty Minutes in Boston Bruins franchise history.

Career statistics

Coaching statistics

See also
List of NHL players with 2,000 career penalty minutes

References

External links
 
 Article about number retirement and achievements at bostonbruins.com

1951 births
Living people
Boston Braves (AHL) players
Boston Bruins captains
Boston Bruins coaches
Boston Bruins draft picks
Boston Bruins players
Boston Bruins announcers
Canadian ice hockey coaches
Canadian ice hockey right wingers
Canadian people of Irish descent
Ice hockey people from Ontario
National Hockey League first-round draft picks
National Hockey League players with retired numbers
New York Rangers coaches
Oshawa Generals players
Sportspeople from Niagara Falls, Ontario